Defending champion Frank Dancevic lost in qualifying for this year's tournament. 
Jürgen Melzer defeated qualifier Denis Kudla 6–4, 2–6, 6–1 in the final to win the title.

Seeds

Draw

Finals

Top half

Bottom half

References

 Main Draw
 Qualifying Draw

Dallas Tennis Classic - Singles
2013 Singles